Steve Jobs (1955–2011) was an American business magnate and co-founder of Apple Inc.

Steve Jobs may also refer to:

 Steve Jobs (book), a 2011 biography about Jobs by Walter Isaacson
Jobs (film), a 2013 drama film about Steve Jobs
 Steve Jobs (film), a 2015 drama film about Steve Jobs
 Steve Jobs: The Lost Interview, 2012 documentary film
 Steve Jobs: The Man in the Machine, a 2015 documentary about Jobs
 Steve Jobs (clothing company)

See also 
 List of artistic depictions of Steve Jobs